Convex Computer Corporation was a company that developed, manufactured and marketed vector minisupercomputers and supercomputers for small-to-medium-sized businesses. Their later Exemplar series of parallel computing machines were based on the Hewlett-Packard (HP) PA-RISC microprocessors, and in 1995, HP bought the company. Exemplar machines were offered for sale by HP for some time, and Exemplar technology was used in HP's V-Class machines.

History

Convex was formed in 1982 by Bob Paluck and Steve Wallach in Richardson, Texas. It was originally named Parsec and early prototype and production boards bear that name. They planned on producing a machine very similar in architecture to the Cray Research vector processor machines, with a somewhat lower performance, but with a much better price/performance ratio. In order to lower costs, the Convex designs were not as technologically aggressive as Cray's, and were based on more mainstream chip technology, attempting to make up for the loss in performance in other ways.

Their first machine was the C1, released in 1985. The C1 was very similar to the Cray-1 in general design, but its CPU and main memory was implemented with slower but less expensive CMOS technology. They offset this by increasing the capabilities of the vector units, including doubling the vector registers' length to 128 64-bit elements each. It also used virtual memory as opposed to the static memory system of the Cray machines, which improved programming. It was generally rated at 20 MFLOPS peak for double precision (64-bit), and 40 MFLOPS peak for single precision (32-bit), about one fifth the normal speed of the Cray-1. They also invested heavily in advanced automatic vectorizing compilers in order to gain performance when existing programs were ported to their systems. The machines ran a BSD version of Unix known initially as Convex Unix then later as ConvexOS due to trademark and licensing issues. ConvexOS has DEC VMS compatibility features as well as Cray Fortran features. Their Fortran compiler went on to be licensed to other computers such as Ardent Computer and Stellar (and merged Stardent).

The C2 was a crossbar-interconnected multiprocessor version of the C1, with up to four CPUs, released in 1988. It used newer 20,000-gate CMOS and 10,000-gate emitter-coupled logic (ECL) gate arrays for a boost in clock speed from 10 MHz to 25 MHz, and rated at 50 MFLOPS peak for double precision per CPU (100 MFLOPS peak for single precision). It was Convex's most successful product.

The C2 was followed by the C3 in 1991, being essentially similar to the C2 but with a faster clock and support for up to eight CPUs implemented with low-density GaAs FPGAs. Various configurations of the C3 were offered, with 50 to 240 MFLOPS per CPU. However, the C3 and the Convex business model were overtaken by changes in the computer industry. The arrival of RISC microprocessors meant that it was no longer possible to develop cost-effective high-performance computing as a standalone small low-volume company. While the C3 was delivered late, which resulted in lost sales, it was still not going to be able to compete with commodity high-performance computing in the long run.

Another speed boost used in the C3 and C4, which moved the hardware implementation to GaAs-based chips, following an evolution identical to that of the Cray machines, but the effort was too little, too late. Some considered the whole C4 program to be nothing more than chasing a business in decline. By this time, even though Convex was the first vendor to ship a GaAs based product, they were losing money.

In 1994, Convex introduced an entirely new design, known as the Exemplar. Unlike the C-series vector computer, the Exemplar was a parallel-computing machine that used HP PA-7200 microprocessors, connected together using SCI. First dubbed MPP, these machines were later called SPP  and Exemplar and sold under the SPP-1600 moniker. The expectation was that a software programming model for parallel computing could draw in customers. But the type of customers Convex attracted believed in Fortran and brute force rather than sophisticated technology. The operating system also had terrible performance problems which could not easily be fixed. Eventually, Convex established a working partnership with HP's hardware and software divisions. Initially it was intended that the Exemplar would be binary-compatible with HP's HP-UX operating system but eventually it was decided to port HP-UX to the platform and sell the platform as standalone servers.

In 1995, Hewlett-Packard bought Convex. HP sold Convex Exemplar machines under the S-Class (MP) and X-Class (CC-NUMA) titles, and later incorporated some of Exemplar's technology into the V-Class machine, which was released running the HP-UX 11.0 release instead of the SPP-UX version which was sold with the S- and X-Class products.

Culture
According to most former employees, Convex was a very fun place at which to work. For some time, there were beer parties every Friday, and an annual Convex Beach Party (where a truck load of sand would be dumped on the parking lot to simulate a beach in Richardson, Texas). There was a fitness center and other recreational facilities on-site.  Convex had a very clear and compelling mission statement: "The Fastest Computers Possible for Under $1M".

Convex had an unusually thorough interview process, which, for technical positions, included a grilling by a group of engineers. The extensive interview process carried over to other departments as well, where the key people who would be working with the prospective employee each interviewed the candidate, then met in roundtable to discuss whether or not to hire.

Convex lasted longer than most minisupercomputer companies, and to celebrate this and more so to remind themselves of the difficulties of the market, Convex had a graveyard of former competitor companies on its property.

Ex-employees of Convex jokingly refer to themselves as ex-cons. There is a mailing list of Convex ex-employees, as well as frequent reunions.

Famous People at Convex
Some famous names in computing worked at Convex.
 Co-founder Steve Wallach is well known for his work at Data General, Convex, Convey Computer Corporation and other companies.
 Brian Berliner developer of the current Concurrent Versions System is an ExCon.
 Rob Kolstad, head of software at Convex, and secretary of USENIX, afterwards became CEO of BSDI which won the landmark BSDI (& UC-Berkeley) vs. USL UNIX lawsuit which made 4.4BSD-Lite an official freely-redistributable open-source UNIX, i.e. it made Berkeley UNIX open-source software.
 Tom Christiansen of Perl fame worked at Convex in the Technical Assistance Center and then on a project called Convex Meta Series, which was an attempt to create cheap  cluster computers.
 Dan Connolly of HTML and W3C fame worked at Convex on the documentation tools team.
 Harry Foster, is the Chief Scientist Verification at Siemens EDA, authored 6 functional verification books, and served as the IEEE/ACM 58th Design Automation Conference General Chair.
 Ken Harward, who became studio director at Ritual Entertainment, also worked on documentation tools at Convex.
 Mark Lutz author of several Python programming language books, worked at Convex.
 Frank Marshall who led Cisco Systems to great success in the 1990s was VP of engineering at Convex during its peak years.
 Robert Morris, famous for both the Morris worm and as a founding partner of Y Combinator, worked as a summer intern at Convex.
 Craig Warner is now an R&D Engineer at HP.
 Jon Gelsey is now CEO at Auth0.

References

External links
Convex ex-employees website

1995 mergers and acquisitions
American companies established in 1982
American companies disestablished in 1995
Companies based in Richardson, Texas
Computer companies established in 1982
Computer companies disestablished in 1995
Defunct computer companies of the United States
Defunct computer hardware companies
Hewlett-Packard acquisitions
Vector supercomputers